XCU: Extreme Close Up is a 2001 thriller film directed by Sean S. Cunningham and starring Susan Egan, Sarah Chalke, Jay Michael Ferguson, Reggie Lee, and Danica McKellar.

Plot
Television producer Karen Webber has built her career on her ability to create top-rated primetime television, but as house mates and crew start turning up dead on the network's hit show, XCU, Karen and her cast of instant celebrities cannot possibly anticipate just how extreme their reality show is about to become.

Cast
Susan Egan as Karen Webber
Sarah Chalke as Jane Bennett
Jay Michael Ferguson as Dylan Dean
Reggie Lee as Nuey Phan
Danica McKellar as Sarah
Ellina McCormick as Cody Ironwood
A. J. Buckley as Terrance "T-Bone" Tucker
Careena Melia as Parker Eastman Clarke
Richard Stay as Matthias Van Blaarderin
Essence Atkins as Tamikah Jones
C. Thomas Howell as Geoffrey Liddy

External links

2001 films
Films scored by Harry Manfredini
Films directed by Sean S. Cunningham
2001 thriller films
Films about television
Films about television people
American thriller films
2000s English-language films
2000s American films